Anna Chakvetadze was the defending champion, but chose not to participate that year.

Virginie Razzano won her first WTA tour title, defeating Tzipora Obziler in the final 6–3, 6–0.

Seeds

Draw

Finals

Top half

Bottom half

External links
Main and Qualifying draw

2007 Guangzhou International Women's Open Singles
Guangzhou International Women's Open Singles